Filipino actress Angel Locsin has appeared in motion pictures and television programs. She made her screen debut at age 15 as the young Robina Gokongwei in the biopic Ping Lacson: Super Cop (2000). Her first television appearance was in the teen drama series Click (2002), followed by a string of guest roles in the romance series Ang Iibigin ay Ikaw (2002), Twin Hearts (2003), and Love to Love (2003). Locsin had minor appearances in the second and third installments of the Mano Po film franchise, Mano Po 2: My Home (2002) and Mano Po 3: My Love (2003). In 2004, she had her breakthrough role as the avian-human hybrid heroine in the fantasy series Mulawin, a role she reprised in its 2005 film adaptation.

Locsin gained wider recognition and received praise for portraying the title character in the 2005 television series Darna, which is based on Mars Ravelo's comics superheroine of the same name. She starred opposite Richard Gutierrez in the romantic dramas Let the Love Begin (2005) and I Will Always Love You (2006). During this period, Locsin appeared alongside Dennis Trillo in the horror thriller Txt (2006) and the fantasy adventure series Majika (2006). She reunited with Richard Gutierrez in the coming-of-age drama The Promise (2007) and played a collector for a secret society in the action-adventure series Asian Treasures (2007) with Robin Padilla. For her role as a fledgling lycanthrope in the supernatural drama series Lobo (2008), she earned an International Emmy Award nomination for Best Actress. The same year, Locsin appeared in an episode of the anthology series Maalaala Mo Kaya, for which she won a Star Award for Best Actress. She then played an aspiring chef in the comedy series remake Only You (2009), and portrayed the offspring of her lycan character in Lobos sequel, Imortal (2010).

Critical success followed with Locsin's performances in collaborations with high-profile directors. She played a ranch worker in Rory Quintos' drama Love Me Again (2009), a courtesan in Olivia Lamasan's star-crossed romance In the Name of Love (2011), and a sexually promiscuous journalist afraid of commitment in  Cathy Garcia-Molina's comedy Unofficially Yours (2012). For playing a single mother forced to reconnect with her estranged husband to be their son's stem cell donor in the romantic drama One More Try (2012), she garnered Best Actress wins at the FAMAS and Star Awards. Locsin's portrayals of the grief-stricken title character in the drama series The Legal Wife (2014) and the indoctrinated military nurse in the spy-action thriller series The General's Daughter (2019) earned her nominations at the Star Awards. She won Best Actress in a Drama Series for the latter. In 2016, she appeared in the comedies Everything About Her and The Third Party.

Aside from acting, Locsin served as a judge during the fifth and sixth seasons of the reality talent competition show Pilipinas Got Talent. She also provided her voice to the animated series Initial D: Fourth Stage (2004).

Film
{| class="wikitable sortable plainrowheaders"
|+ 
|- style="background:#ccc; text-align:center;"
! scope="col" | Year
!scope="col"| Title
!scope="col"| Role
!scope="col" class="unsortable" | Notes
!scope="col" class="unsortable" | 
|-
|2000
!scope=row| Ping Lacson: Supercop
| 
|
|style="text-align:center;"|
|-
|2003
!scope=row| Mano Po 2: My Home
| 
|
|style="text-align:center;"|
|-
|2004
!scope=row| Kuya
| 
|
|style="text-align:center;"|
|-
|2004
!scope=row| Singles
| 
|
|style="text-align:center;"|
|-
|2004
!scope=row| Sigaw
| 
|
|style="text-align:center;"|
|-
|2004
!scope=row| Mano Po 3: My Love
| 
|
|style="text-align:center;"|
|-
|2005
!scope=row| Let the Love Begin
| 
|
|style="text-align:center;"|
|-
|2005
!scope=row| Mulawin: The Movie
| 
|
|style="text-align:center;"|
|-
|2006
!scope=row| I Will Always Love You
| 
|
|style="text-align:center;"|
|-
|2006
!scope=row| TxT
| 
|
|style="text-align:center;"|
|-
|2006
!scope=row| Mano Po 5: Gua Ai Di
| 
|
|style="text-align:center;"|
|-
|2007
!scope=row| 
| 
|
|style="text-align:center;"|
|-
|2007
!scope=row| Angels
| 
|
|style="text-align:center;"|
|-
|2009
!scope=row| Love Me Again
| 
|
|style="text-align:center;"|
|-
|2010
!scope=row| My Amnesia Girl
| 
| Cameo
|style="text-align:center;"|
|-
|2011
!scope=row| In the Name of Love
| 
| 
|style="text-align:center;"|
|-
|2012
!scope=row| Unofficially Yours
| 
| 
|style="text-align:center;"|
|-
|2012
!scope=row| One More Try
| 
| 
|style="text-align:center;"|
|-
|2013
!scope=row| Four Sisters and a Wedding
| 
| 
|style="text-align:center;"|
|-
|2013
!scope=row| 
| 
| Cameo
|style="text-align:center;"|
|-
|2016
!scope=row| Everything About Her
| 
| 
|style="text-align:center;"|
|-
|2016
!scope=row| 
| 
| 
|style="text-align:center;"|
|-
|2020
!scope=row| Block Z
| 
| Cameo
|style="text-align:center;"|
|-
|2020
!scope=row| Four Sisters Before the Wedding
| 
| Cameo
|style="text-align:center;"|
|}

Television
{| class="wikitable sortable plainrowheaders"
|+ 
|- style="background:#ccc; text-align:center;"
! scope="col" | Year
!scope="col"| Title
!scope="col"| Role
!scope="col" class="unsortable" | Notes
!scope="col" class="unsortable" | 
|-
|2002
!scope=row| Click
| 
|
|style="text-align:center;"|
|-
|2002
!scope=row| Ang Iibigin ay Ikaw
| 
|
|style="text-align:center;"|
|-
|2003
!scope=row| Ang Iibigin ay Ikaw Pa Rin
| 
|
|style="text-align:center;"|
|-
|2003
!scope=row| Twin Hearts
| align=center|
|
|style="text-align:center;"|
|-
|2003
!scope=row| Love to Love
| align=center|
| Episode: "Kissing Beauty"
|style="text-align:center;"|
|-
|2004
!scope=row| All Together Now
| align=center|
| 
|style="text-align:center;"|
|-
|2004
!scope=row| Magpakailanman
| 
| Guest role
|style="text-align:center;"|
|-
|2004
!scope=row| Mulawin
| 
| 
|style="text-align:center;"|
|-
|2004
!scope=row| Initial D: Fourth Stage
|  (voice)
| Animated series
|style="text-align:center;"|
|-
|2004
!scope=row| Darna
| 
| 
|style="text-align:center;"|
|-
|2006
!scope=row| Majika
| 
| 
|style="text-align:center;"|
|-
|2007
!scope=row| Asian Treasures
| 
| 
|style="text-align:center;"|
|-
|2007
!scope=row| Maalaala Mo Kaya
| 
| Episode: "Pilat"
|style="text-align:center;"|
|-
|2008
!scope=row| Lobo
| 
| 
|style="text-align:center;"|
|-
|2009
!scope=row| Only You
| 
| 
|style="text-align:center;"|
|-
|2009
!scope=row| Maalaala Mo Kaya
| 
| Episode: "Blusa"
|style="text-align:center;"|
|-
|2010
!scope=row| Imortal
| 
| 
|style="text-align:center;"|
|-
|2010
!scope=row| Maalaala Mo Kaya
| 
| Episode: "Litrato"
|style="text-align:center;"|
|-
|2011
!scope=row| 100 Days to Heaven
| 
| Guest role
|style="text-align:center;"|
|-
|2011
!scope=row| Toda Max
| 
| 
|style="text-align:center;"|
|-
|2012
!scope=row| Wansapanataym
| 
| Episode: "Ang Kulay ng Pasko"
|style="text-align:center;"|
|-
|2013
!scope=row| Maalaala Mo Kaya
| 
| Episode: "Mask"
|style="text-align:center;"|
|-
|2014
!scope=row| 
| 
| 
|style="text-align:center;"|
|-
|2015
!scope=row| Maalaala Mo Kaya
| 
| Episode: "Plano"
|style="text-align:center;"|
|-
|2016
!scope=row| Pilipinas Got Talent
| 
| Judge
|style="text-align:center;"|
|-
|2017
!scope=row| Maalaala Mo Kaya
| 
| Episode: "Kotse-kotsehan"
|style="text-align:center;"|
|-
|2017
!scope=row| La Luna Sangre
| 
| Guest role
|style="text-align:center;"|
|-
|2018
!scope=row| Pilipinas Got Talent
| 
| Judge
|style="text-align:center;"|
|-
|2019
!scope=row| Kadenang Ginto
| 
| Cameo
|style="text-align:center;"|
|-
|2019
!scope=row| 
| 
| 
|style="text-align:center;"|
|-
|2020
!scope=row| Iba Yan
| 
| Host
|style="text-align:center;"|
|}

See also
 List of awards and nominations received by Angel Locsin

References

External links
 

Actress filmographies
Philippine filmographies